.pr is the Internet country code top-level domain (ccTLD) for Puerto Rico.

A .pr.us second-level domain has been reserved for Puerto Rico under the .us locality namespace, but it is unused. Agencies of the government of Puerto Rico use either .gov.pr or, more recently, subdomains of pr.gov, where the main government portal is located.

In March 2010, National Public Radio launched a URL shortener using the domain hack "n.pr".

Domains and sub domains
 .pr – for businesses, professionals, individuals, companies, public relations, etc.
 .biz.pr – for businesses
 .com.pr – for companies, but not restricted to
 .edu.pr – for educational institutions with presence in Puerto Rico
 .gov.pr – for agencies of the government of Puerto Rico
 .info.pr – for informative websites
 .isla.pr – for people with presence in Puerto Rico
 .name.pr – for individuals
 .net.pr – for network oriented entities, but not restricted to
 .org.pr – for organizations, but not restricted to
 .pro.pr – for professionals
 .est.pr – for university students
 .prof.pr – for university professors
 .ac.pr – for academics

See also

Internet in Puerto Rico
Internet in the United States
.us

External links
 .PR Registrar
 IANA .pr whois information

References

Country code top-level domains
Telecommunications in Puerto Rico

sv:Toppdomän#P